A Boy Born from Mold and Other Delectable Morsels is the second book of children's short stories by Lorin Morgan-Richards. Originally published in 2010, Richards's book of gloomy tales pokes fun at the absurdities of life.

Humor
The book is largely compared to Edward Gorey and Tim Burton but characteristically weaves a deeper expression of sentiment not found in his earlier collection.

Richards relates how the title story has been perceived by the readers: Some have thought of it as giving insight into some sort of pagan beliefs. One commented it was a metaphor for the Celtic Tree of Life. The little girl upstairs represents an above plane while 'Rune' resides in the below or Otherworld, and the remaining between provides the journey towards consciousness of spirit and self-interconnected. I will not say if these are accurate or intentional in any way, but obviously, the story itself was meant to fascinate adults as well as children, and like one reviewer mentioned, this story is fundamentally about finding oneself.

Further reading reveals Zoog is a vampire who is hiding his allergy to blood and is found staring at a rainbow, while a  woman accidentally feeds her 100 cats a sponge instead of cheese, and a man questions his existence only to be mistaken for a garden gnome.

Contents
 A Boy Born from Mold 
 Lawrence Little 
 The Misanthropic Plunger 
 The Cold Pigeon Who Found Comfort in a Mock Owl 
 The Cryptic Life of Penny Brown 
 The Fruit Bat 
 The Finicky Cats 
 A Rare Benign Belbow (2014 Paperback edition) 
 Willy Nilleee and the Red-Tailed Squirrel (2014 Paperback edition)

Editions
Modeling the construction of his first book Simon Snootle and Other Small Stories, Richards produced a pocket-sized handmade first edition of the book using dark blue faux leather with hand sewn linen pages inside. The cover was in a light blue background with an illustration of Ruin from the title story, who appears to be wearing several cultural tokens. A paperback edition of the book was released in 2014 with a cover showing Rune (Ruin) with a rat teaching him how to write, and the young vampire Zoog behind him. The paperback includes two stories not published in the first edition: "A Rare Benign Belbow" (originally released in 2011 with The Terribly Mini Monster Book) and "Willy Nillee and the Red-Tailed Squirrel".

Audiobook
The audiobook features the narration of Jason Shepherd with a special music introduction by Seongje Hwang and Tae Sung Jie.

References

2010 children's books
2010 short story collections
Children's short story collections
American picture books
Black comedy books
Books about cats